Flower chafers are a group of scarab beetles, comprising the subfamily Cetoniinae. Many species are diurnal and visit flowers for pollen and nectar, or to browse on the petals. Some species also feed on fruit. The group is also called fruit and flower chafers, flower beetles and flower scarabs. There are around 4,000 species, many of them still undescribed.

Twelve tribes are presently recognized: Cetoniini, Cremastocheilini, Diplognathini, Goliathini, Gymnetini, Phaedimini, Schizorhinini, Stenotarsiini, Taenioderini, Trichiini, Valgini, and Xiphoscelidini. The tribe Gymnetini is the biggest of the American tribes, and Goliathini contains the largest species, and is mainly found in the rainforest regions of Africa.

Description
Adult flower chafers are usually brightly coloured beetles, often metallic, and somewhat flattened in shape. The insertions of the antennae are visible from above, while the mandibles and labrum are hidden by the clypeus. The elytra lack a narrow membranous margin and are truncate to expose the pygidium. The abdominal spiracles are diverging so that several lie on the abdominal sternites with at least one exposed. The fore coxae are conical and produced ventrally, while the mid coxae are transverse or only slightly oblique. The mesothoracic epimera is visible from above. The tarsi are each equipped with a pair of simple (not forked) tarsal claws of subequal size.

A feature possessed by adults of many flower chafers, especially Cetoniini, is lateral emargination of the elytra.

Larvae are stout-bodied and very hairy with short legs. The head is partly covered by the prothorax. Each antenna has the apical segment as wide as the penultimate segment. The galea and lacinia are used to form a mala. The anal cleft is transverse. The mandible has a ventral stridulating area. The labrum is symmetrical with a deeply pigmented notch on each side of the midline.

Biology
Adult cetoniines are herbivorous, being found on flowers (from which they consume nectar and pollen), tree sap and rotting fruit. Larvae generally live and feed in decaying plant matter (including decaying wood) or soil. In captivity, cetoniine larvae will feed on soft fruit.

Many species in the tribe Cremastocheilini are known to be predaceous, feeding on hymenopteran larvae or soft-bodied nymphs of Auchenorrhyncha. Spilophorus spp. have been noted feeding on the nesting material and excrement of South African passerine birds, while Spilophorus maculatus has been recorded feeding on Oxyrhachis sp. nymphs and Hoplostomus fuligineus is known to feed on the brood of honey bees in South Africa and the pupae of the wasp Belonogaster petiolata. Campsiura javanica feeds on the larvae of Ropalidia montana in southern India. Cremastocheilus stathamae feeds on ants of the genus Myrmecocystus.

In terms of movement, adults are considered some of the best flyers among beetles. They can hover above and land on flowers or fruit. When threatened by predators, they escape by either performing a rush take off or by falling toward the ground and then flying before impact. Many cetoniines fly with their elytra closed, as their hindwings can unfold and slide out under the elytra during flight (thanks to the emargination of the elytra).

Larvae of some taxa can crawl on their backs using their tergal folds, which are covered in strong bristles. Others crawl on their legs.

Systematics and taxonomy
The tribes of subfamily Cetoniinae, with some notable genera also listed, are:

Tribus Cetoniini

Subtribus Cetoniina
Aethiessa Burmeister, 1842
Anatona Burmeister, 1842
Anelaphinis Kolbe, 1912
Aphelinis Antoine, 1987
Atrichelaphinis Kraatz, 1898
Atrichiana Distant, 1911
Badizoblax Thomson, 1877
Callophylla Moser, 1916
Centrantyx Fairmaire, 1884
Cetonia Fabricius, 1775
Chewia Legrand, 2004
Chiloloba Burmeister, 1842
Cosmesthes Kraatz, 1880
Cosmiophaena Kraatz, 1899
Dischista Burmeister, 1842
Dolichostethus Kolbe, 1912
Elaphinis Burmeister, 1842
Enoplotarsus Lucas, 1859
Erlangeria Preiss, 1902
Gametis Burmeister, 1842
Gametoides Antoine, 2006
Glycosia Schoch, 1896
Glycyphana Burmeister, 1842
Gymnophana Arrow, 1910
Hemiprotaetia Mikšič, 1963
Heteralleucosma Antoine, 1989
Heterocnemis Albers, 1852
Heterotephraea Antoine, 2002
Lawangia Schenkling, 1921
Lorkovitschia Mikšič, 1968
Marmylida Thomson, 1880
Mireia Ruter, 1953
Niphobleta Kraatz, 1880
Pachnoda Burmeister, 1842
Pachnodoides Alexis & Delpont, 2002
Paleopragma Thomson, 1880
Paralleucosma Antoine, 1989
Paranelaphinis Antoine, 1988
Paraprotaetia Moser, 1907
Pararhabdotis Kraatz, 1899
Parastraella Antoine, 2006
Parelaphinis Holm & Marais, 1989
Phaneresthes Kraatz, 1894
Phoxomeloides Schoch, 1898
Podopholis Moser, 1915
Podopogonus Moser, 1917
Polybaphes Kirby, 1827
Polystalactica Kraatz, 1882
Protaetia Burmeister, 1842
Liocola Thomson, 1859
Potosia Mulsant & Rey, 1871
Protaetiomorpha Mikšič, 1968
Pseudoprotaetia Kraatz, 1882
Pseudotephraea Kraatz, 1882
Reineria Mikšič, 1968
Rhabdotis Burmeister, 1842
Rhabdotops Krikken, 1981
Rhyxiphloea Burmeister, 1842 (= "Rhixiphloea")
Simorrhina Kraatz, 1886
Somalibia Lansberge, 1882
Stalagmosoma Burmeister, 1842
Sternoplus Wallace, 1868
Systellorhina Kraatz, 1895
Tephraea Burmeister, 1842
Thyreogonia Reitter, 1898
Trichocelis Moser, 1908
Trichocephala Moser, 1916
Tropinota Mulsant, 1842
Xeloma Kraatz, 1881

Subtribus Euphoriina
Euphoria Burmeister, 1842
Chlorixanthe Bates, 1889

Subtribus Leucocelina
Acrothyrea Kraatz, 1882
Alleucosma Schenkling, 1921
Amaurina Kolbe, 1895
Analleucosma Antoine, 1989
Cyrtothyrea Kolbe, 1895
Discopeltis Burmeister, 1842
Grammopyga Kraatz, 1895
Heteralleucosma Antoine, 1989
Homothyrea Kolbe, 1895
Leucocelis Burmeister, 1842
Lonchothyrea Kolbe, 1895
Mausoleopsis Lansberge, 1882
Mecaspidiellus Antoine, 1997
Molynoptera Kraatz, 1897
Molynopteroides Antoine, 1989
Oxythyrea Mulsant, 1842
Paleira Reiche, 1871
Paralleucosma Antoine, 1989
Phoxomela Schaum, 1844
Pseudalleucosma Antoine, 1989
Pseudooxythyrea Baraud, 1985

Tribus Cremastocheilini
Subtribus Aspilina
Aspilus Schaum, 1848
Protochilus Krikken, 1976
Subtribus Coenochilina
Arielina Rossi, 1958
Astoxenus Péringuey, 1907
Basilewskynia Schein, 1957
Coenochilus Schaum, 1841
Ruterielina Rojkoff, 2010
Subtribus Cremastocheilina
Centrochilus Krikken, 1976
Clinterocera Motschulsky, 1857
Cremastocheilus Knoch, 1801
Cyclidiellus Krikken, 1976
Cyclidinus Westwood, 1874
Cyclidius MacLeay, 1838
Genuchinus Westwood, 1874
Lissomelas Bates, 1889
Paracyclidius Howden, 1971
Platysodes Westwood, 1873
Psilocnemis Burmeister, 1842
Subtribus Cymophorina
Cymophorus Kirby, 1827
Myrmecochilus Wasmann, 1900
Rhagopteryx Burmeister, 1842
Subtribus Genuchina
Genuchus Kirby, 1825
Meurguesia Ruter, 1969
Problerhinus Deyrolle, 1864
Subtribus Goliathopsidina
Goliathopsis Janson, 1881
Subtribus Heterogeniina
Heterogenius Moser, 1911
Subtribus Lissogeniina
Chtonobius Burmeister, 1847
Lissogenius Schaum, 1844
Subtribus Macromina
Brachymacroma Kraatz, 1896
Campsiura Hope, 1831
Macromina Westwood, 1874
Pseudopilinurgus Moser, 1918
Subtribus Nyassinina
Nyassinus Westwood, 1879
Subtribus Oplostomatina
Anatonochilus Péringuey, 1907
Laurentiana Ruter, 1952
Oplostomus W.S. MacLeay, 1838
Placodidus Péringuey, 1900
Scaptobius Schaum, 1841
Subtribus Pilinurgina
Callynomes Mohnike, 1873
Centrognathus Guérin-Méneville, 1840
Parapilinurgus Arrow, 1910
Periphanesthes Kraatz, 1880
Pilinurgus Burmeister, 1842
Subtribus Spilophorina
Spilophorus Schaum, 1848
Subtribus Telochilina
Telochilus Krikken, 1975
Subtribus Trichoplina
Lecanoderus Kolbe, 1908
Trichoplus Burmeister, 1842
Subtribus Trogodina
Pseudoscaptobius Krikken, 1976
Trogodes Westwood, 1873

Tribus Diplognathini
Anoplocheilus MacLeay, 1838
Anthracophora Burmeister, 1842
Anthracophorides Moser, 1918
Apocnosoides Antoine, 2001
Charadronota Burmeister, 1842
Conradtia Kolbe, 1892
Diphrontis Gerstäcker, 1882
Diplognatha Gory & Percheron, 1833
Eriulis Burmeister, 1842
Hadrodiplognatha Kraatz, 1898
Heteropseudinca Valck Lucassen, 1933
Lamellothyrea Krikken, 1980
Metallopseudinca Valck Lucassen, 1933
Niphetophora Kraatz, 1883
Odontorrhina Burmeister, 1842
Parapoecilophila Hauser, 1904
Phonopleurus Moser, 1919
Pilinopyga Kraatz, 1880
Porphyronota Burmeister, 1842
Pseudinca Kraatz, 1880
Stethopseudinca Valck Lucassen, 1933
Tetragonorhina Kraatz, 1896 (= "Tetragonorrhina")
Trichostetha Burmeister, 1842
Triplognatha Krikken, 1987
Trymodera Gerstaecker, 1867
Uloptera Burmeister, 1842

Tribus Goliathini

Subtribus Dicronocephalina
Dicronocephalus Hope, 1837
Subtribus Goliathina
Fornasinius Bertoloni, 1853
Goliathus Lamarck, 1801
Hegemus J. Thomson, 1881
Hypselogenia  Burmeister, 1840
Subtribus Ichnestomatina
Gariep Péringuey, 1907
Ichnestoma Gory & Percheron, 1833
Karooida Perissinotto, 2020
Mzansica Perissinotto, 2020
Paraxeloma Holm, 1988
Subtribus Rhomborhinina
Anagnathocera  Arrow, 1922
Anisorrhina  Westwood, 1842
Asthenorhella Westwood, 1874 (= "Asthenorrhella" Bergé, = "Asthenorrhinella" Schoch)
Asthenorhina Westwood, 1843 (= "Asthenorrhina" Gemminger & Harold)
Bietia  Fairmaire, 1898
Bothrorrhina Burmeister, 1842
Caelorrhina Hope, 1841 (= "Coelorrhina" Burmeister)
Cheirolasia Westwood, 1843
Chloresthia Fairmaire, 1905
Chlorocala Kirby, 1828
Chondrorrhina Kraatz, 1880
Compsocephalus White, 1845
Cosmiomorpha Saunders, 1854
Cyphonocephalus Westwood, 1842
Desfontainesia Alexis & Delpont, 1999
Dicellachilus Waterhouse, 1905
Dicheros Gory & Percheron, 1833
Dicronorhina Hope, 1837 (= "Dicranorrhina" Burmeister, "Dicronorrhina" Burmeister)
Diphyllomorpha Hope, 1843
Dymusia Burmeister, 1842
Euchloropus Arrow, 1907
Eudicella White, 1839
Eutelesmus Waterhouse, 1880
Gnathocera Kirby, 1825
Gnorimimelus Kaatz, 1880
Hemiheterorrhina Mikšić, 1974
Herculaisia Seilliere, 1910
Heterorhina Westwood, 1842 (= "Heterorrhina")
Ingrisma Fairmaire, 1893
Ischnoscelis Burmeister, 1842
Jumnos Saunders, 1839
Lansbergia Ritsema, 1888
Lophorrhina Westwood, 1842
Lophorrhinides Perissinotto, Clennell & Beinhundner, 2019
Mawenzhena Alexis & Delpont, 2001
Mecynorhina Hope, 1837
Moseriana Ruter, 1965
Mystroceros Burmeister, 1842
Narycius Dupont, 1835
Neomystroceros Alexis & Delpont, 1998
Neophaedimus Schoch, 1894
Neoscelis Schoch, 1897
Pedinorrhina Kraatz, 1880
Petrovitzia Mikšić, 1965
Plaesiorrhina Burmeister, 1842
Platynocephalus  Westwood, 1854
Priscorrhina Krikken, 1984
Pseudodiceros Mikšić, 1974
Pseudotorynorrhina Mikšič, 1967
Ptychodesthes Kraatz, 1883
Raceloma J. Thomson, 1877
Rhamphorrhina Klug, 1855
Rhinarion Ruter, 1965
Rhomborhina Hope 1837 (= "Rhomborrhina" Burmeister)
Scythropesthes Kraatz, 1880
Smicorhina Westwood, 1847
Spelaiorrhina Lansberge, 1886
Stephanorrhina Burmeister, 1842
Taurhina Burmeister, 1842 (= "Taurrhina" Kraatz)
Tmesorrhina  Westwood, 1842
Torynorrhina  Arrow, 1907
Trichoneptunides Legrand, 2001
Trigonophorinus Pouillaude, 1913
Trigonophorus Hope, 1831

Tribus Gymnetini
Subtribus Blaesiina
Blaesia Burmeister, 1842
Halffterinetis Morón and Nogueira, 2007
Subtribus Gymnetina
Allorhina Burmeister, 1842
Amazula Kraatz, 1882
Amithao J. Thomson, 1878
Argyripa J. Thomson, 1878
Astrocara Schürhoff, 1937
Badelina J. Thomson, 1880
Balsameda J. Thomson, 1880
Chiriquiba Bates, 1889
Clinteria Burmeister, 1842
Clinteroides Schoch, 1898
Cotinis Burmeister, 1842
Desicasta J. Thomson, 1878
Guatemalica Poll, 1886
Gymnetina Casey, 1915
Gymnetis MacLeay, 1819 
Gymnetosoma Martínez, 1949
Hadrosticta Kraatz, 1892
Heterocotinis Martínez, 1949
Hologymnetis Martínez, 1949 (synonym = Cineretis Schürhoff, 1937)
Hoplopyga J. Thomson, 1880
Hoplopygothrix Schürhoff, 1933
Jansonella Blackwelder, 1944
Macrocranius Schürhoff, 1935
Marmarina Kirby, 1827
Neocorvicoana Ratcliffe & Micó, 2001
Stethodesma Bainbridge, 1840
Tiarocera Burmeister, 1842

Tribus Phaedimini
Phaedimus Waterhouse, 1841
Hemiphaedimus Mikšič, 1972
Philistina W.S. MacLeay, 1838
Theodosia J. Thomson, 1880

Tribus Schizorhinini
Subtribus Lomapterina
Agestrata Eschscholtz, 1829
Ischiopsopha Gestro, 1874
Lomaptera Gory & Percheron, 1833
Lomapteroides Schoch, 1898
Megaphonia Schürhoff, 1933
Morokia Janson, 1905
Mycterophallus Van de Poll, 1886
Subtribus Schizorhinina
Anacamptorrhina Blanchard, 1842
Aphanesthes Kraatz, 1880
Axillonia Krikken, 2018
Bisallardiana Antoine, 2003
Chalcopharis Heller, 1901
Chlorobapta Kraatz, 1880
Chondropyga Kraatz, 1880
Clithria Burmeister, 1842
Diaphonia Newman, 1840
Digenethle Thomson, 1877
Dilochrosis Thomson, 1878
Eupoecila Burmeister, 1842
Grandaustralis Hutchinson & Moeseneder, 2013
Hemichnoodes Kraatz, 1880
Hemipharis Burmeister, 1842
Lenosoma Macleay, 1863
Lethosesthes Thomson, 1880
Lyraphora Kraatz, 1880
Macrotina Strand, 1934
Metallesthes Kraatz, 1880
Microdilochrosis Jákl, 2009
Microlomaptera Kraatz, 1885
Micropoecila Kraatz, 1880
Navigator Hutchinson & Moeseneder, 2016
Neoclithria Van de Poll, 1886
Neorrhina J. Thomson, 1878
Octocollis Moeseneder & Hutchinson, 2012
Panglaphyra Kraatz, 1880
Peotoxus Krikken, 1983
Phyllopodium Schoch, 1895
Platedelosis Kraatz, 1880
Poecilopharis Kraatz, 1880
Pseudoclithria Van de Poll, 1886
Schizorhina Kirby, 1825
Schochidia Berg, 1898
Stenopisthes Moser, 1913
Storeyus Hasenpusch & Moeseneder 2010
Tafaia Valck Lucassen, 1939
Tapinoschema Thomson, 1880
Territonia Krikken, 2018
Trichaulax Kraatz, 1880

Tribus Stenotarsiini
Subtribus Anochiliina
Anochilia Burmeister, 1842
Epistalagma Fairmaire, 1880
Subtribus Chromoptiliina
Chromoptilia Westwood, 1842
Descarpentriesia Ruter, 1964
Subtribus Coptomiina
Bricoptis Burmeister, 1842
Coptomia Burmeister, 1842
Coptomiopsis Pouillaude, 1919
Euchilia Burmeister, 1842
Euryomia Burmeister, 1842
Heterocranus Bourgoin, 1919
Hiberasta Fairmaire, 1901
Hyphelithia Kraatz, 1880
Liostraca Burmeister, 1842
Micreuchilia Pouillaude, 1917
Micropeltus Blanchard, 1842
Pareuchilia Kraatz, 1880
Pseudeuryomia Kraatz, 1894
Pygora Burmeister, 1842
Pyrrhopoda Kraatz, 1880
Vieuella Ruter, 1964
Subtribus Doryscelina
Doryscelis Burmeister, 1842
Epixanthis Burmeister, 1842
Hemiaspidius Krikken, 1982
Parepixanthis Kraatz, 1893
Pseudepixanthis Kraatz, 1880
Rhynchocephala Fairmaire, 1883
Subtribus Euchroeina
Euchroea Burmeister, 1842
Subtribus Heterophanina
Heterophana Burmeister, 1842
Oxypelta Pouillaude, 1920
Pogonotarsus Burmeister, 1842
Zebinus Fairmaire, 1894
Subtribus Heterosomatina
Heterosoma Schaum, 1845
Plochilia Fairmaire, 1896
Subtribus Pantoliina
Bonoraella Ruter, 1978
Celidota Burmeister, 1842
Cyriodera Burmeister, 1842
Dirrhina Burmeister, 1842
Hemilia Kraatz, 1880
Lucassenia Olsoufieff, 1940
Moriaphila Kraatz, 1880
Pantolia Burmeister, 1842
Tetraodorhina Blanchard, 1842
Subtribus Parachilina
Parachilia Burmeister, 1842
Subtribus Stenotarsiina
Callipechis Burmeister, 1842
Ischnotarsia Kraatz, 1880
Rhadinotaenia Kraatz, 1900
Stenotarsia Burmeister, 1842
Vadonidella Ruter, 1973

Tribus Taenioderini
Anocoela Moser, 1914
Bacchusia Mikšic, 1976
Bombodes Westwood, 1848
Carneluttia Mikšic, 1976
Chalcothea Burmeister, 1842
Chalcotheomima Mikšic, 1970
Clerota Burmeister, 1842
Coilodera Hope, 1831
Costinota Schürhoff, 1933
Eumacronota Mikšic, 1976
Euremina Wallace, 1867
Euselates Thomson, 1880
Glyptothea Bates, 1889
Glyptotheomima Mikšic, 1976
Gnorimidia van Lansberge, 1887
Hemichalcothea Mikšic, 1970
Ixorida Thomson, 1880 
Mecinonota Kraatz, 1892
Oncosterna Thomson, 1880
Pseudomecinonota Miksic, 1972
Macronotops Krikken, 1977
Meroloba Thomson, 1880
Microchalcothea Moser, 1910
Penthima Kraatz, 1892
Plectrone Wallace, 1867
Pleuronota Kraatz, 1892
Pseudochalcothea Ritsema, 1882
Taeniodera Burmeister, 1842
Xenoloba Bates, 1889

Tribus Trichiini
Subtribus Cryptodontina
Coelocorynus Kolbe, 1895
Cryptodontes Burmeister, 1847
Subtribus Incaina
Golinca Thomson, 1878
Inca Lepeletier & Serville, 1828
Pantodinus Burmeister, 1847
Subtribus Osmodermatina
Osmoderma Lepeletier & Serville, 1825
Platygeniops Krikken, 1978
Subtribus Platygeniina
Platygenia MacLeay, 1819
Subtribus Trichiina
Agnorimus Miyake et al., 1991
Apeltastes Howden, 1968
Brachagenius Kraatz, 1890
Calometopidius Bourgoin, 1917
Calometopus Blanchard, 1850
Campulipus Kirby, 1827
Chaetodermina Heller, 1921
Clastocnemis Burmeister, 1840
Coelocratus Burmeister, 1841
Corynotrichius Kolbe, 1891
Dialithus Parry, 1849
Diploa Kolbe, 1892
Diploeida Péringuey, 1907
Elpidus Péringuey, 1907
Endoxazus Kolbe, 1892
Epitrichius Tagawa, 1941
Eriopeltastes Burmeister, 1840
Giesbertiolus Howden, 1988
Glaphyronyx Moser, 1924
Gnorimella Casey, 1915
Gnorimus Lepeletier & Serville, 1825
Incala J. Thomson, 1858
Incalidia Janson, 1907
Liotrichius Kolbe, 1892
Myodermides Ruter, 1964
Myodermum Burmeister, 1840
Paragnorimus Becker, 1910
Paratrichius Janson, 1881
Peltotrichius Howden, 1968
Pileotrichius Bourgoin, 1921
Polyplastus Janson, 1880
Stegopterus Burmeister, 1840
Stripsipher Gory & Percheron, 1833
Trichiomorphus Bourgoin, 1919
Trichiotinus Casey, 1915
Trichius Fabricius, 1787
Trigonopeltastes Burmeister, 1840
Xiphoscelidus Péringuey, 1907

Tribus Valgini
Subtribe Microvalgina
Ischnovalgus Kolbe, 1897
Microvalgus Kraatz, 1883
Stenovalgus Kolbe, 1892
Subtribe Valgina
Acanthovalgus Kraatz, 1895
Bivalgus Paulian, 1961
Chaetovalgus Moser, 1914
Charitovalgus Kolbe, 1904
Chromovalgus Kolbe, 1897
Comythovalgus Kolbe, 1897
Cosmovalgus Kolbe, 1897
Dasyvalgoides Endrödi, 1952
Dasyvalgus Kolbe, 1904
Euryvalgus Moser, 1908
Excisivalgus Endrödi, 1952
Heterovalgus Krikken, 1978
Homovalgus Kolbe, 1897
Hoplitovalgus Kolbe, 1904
Hybovalgus Kolbe, 1904 
Idiovalgus Arrow, 1910
Lepivalgus Moser, 1914
Lobovalgus Kolbe, 1897
Mimovalgus Arrow, 1944
Oedipovalgus Kolbe, 1897
Oreoderus Burmeister, 1842
Oreovalgus Kolbe, 1904
Podovalgus Arrow, 1910
Pygovalgus Kolbe, 1884
Sphinctovalgus Kolbe, 1904
Tibiovalgus Kolbe, 1904
Valgoides Fairmaire, 1899
Valgus Scriba, 1790
Xenoreoderus Arrow, 1910
Yanovalgus Nomura, 1952

Tribus Xiphoscelidini
Aporecolpa van Lansberge, 1886
Callophylla Moser, 1916
Heteroclita Burmeister, 1842
Ischnostomiella Krikken, 1978
Meridioclita Krikken, 1982
Myodermidius Bourgoin, 1920
Neoclita Perissinotto, 2017
Oroclita Krikken, 1982
Plochiliana Ruter, 1978
Protoclita Krikken, 1978
Rhinocoeta Burmeister, 1842
Scheinia Ruter, 1958
Xiphoscelis Burmeister, 1842
Xiphosceloides Holm, 1992

References

Evans,  Arthur W. Generic Guide to New World Scarabs
Orozco, Jesus.  American Cetoniinae
Sakai, K. & S. Nagai, 1998. The cetoniine Beetles of the World. Tokyo: Mushi-Sha. 421p Excellent illustrations of most species.
White, Richard E. (1998). Beetles : A Field Guide to the Beetles of North America. Boston: Houghton Mifflin. .

External links

 Gallery of flower beetles
 Illustrated key to South Asian chafers
 Punctate Flower Chafer Factfile
 WZCZ Gallery
 Kaferlatein African Cetoniinae website. Literature page.
 flickr tagged images.
 Flower beetles of Israel by Oz Rittner

Scarabaeidae
 

Polyphaga subfamilies